Agonopterix umbellana (gorse soft shoot moth) is a moth of the family Depressariidae. It is native to western Europe, but was introduced to Hawaii in 1988 and New Zealand in 1990 to control Ulex europaeus.

The wingspan is about 21 mm. The forewings are whitish ochreous ; veins and dorsum marked with dark fuscous lines ; first and sometimes second discal stigmata black ; terminal black dots. Hindwings pale whitish-grey, round apex sometimes interruptedly dark-edged. The larva is dull green ; dots black ; head and plate of 2 black

Adults are on wing from August to April. It hibernates during winter and can reappear in the early spring.

The larvae feed on Ulex and Genista species within silken tubes.

References

External links

Biological Control of Gorse in Hawai'i: A program review
UKmoths
Fauna Europaea

Agonopterix
Moths of Europe
Moths described in 1794